

List of Akil Mark Koci's compositions
This is a list of compositions by the Kosovar Albanian composer Akil Mark Koci.

Choral Works
 Lirisë, To Freedom, 1959. First performance: April 1960, Sarajevo.
 Maca e vogël, Little Cat, 1959. First performance: March 1967, Children's Choir Radio Pristina.
 Vajzës, To the Girl, 1960. First performance: June 1968, Kruševac Festival Choir.
 Nënës time, 1960. First performance: February 1988, Choir of Radio Pristina.
 Pa titull, Untitled, 1971. First performance: November 1972, Choir Radio Zagreb, Opatija.
 O, e ëmbëla, 1971. First performance: June 1986, Choir of Radio Pristina.
 Kaltërsirat, 1972. First performance: October 1986, Choir of Radio Pristina.
 Iz zapisa Stevana Mokranjac, From the manuscripts of Stevan Stojanović Mokranjac, 1973. First performance: November 1977, Choir of Radio Belgrade, Opatija.

Voice & Piano
 Popullit tim, To my People, 1971. First performance: November 1977. Music Scene, Pristina.
 Elegji, Elegjy, 1971. First performance: November 1973. Radio Ljubljana, Slovenia.
 Rekviem, Requiem, 1971. First performance: September 1974. Radio Ljubljana, Slovenia.
 Nimfa, 1971. First performance: Music Scene, Pristina.
 Rekviem, Requiem, 1971. First performance: September 1974. Radio Ljubljana, Slovenia.
 Trimja Gjakovare, 1974. First performance: 1986. Music Scene, Pristina.

Symphonies, Suites & Concertos

 Attimo, for string orchestra. First performance: 1973.
 Multiple Sinocricies, for symphonic orchestra. First performance: 1974.
 Silueta, for oboe and strings. First performance: Novi Sad 1975.
 Sirigmofonia, for symphonic orchestra. First performance: Zagreb 1975.
 Simfoni libertas for symphonic orchestra. 1975.
 Ab Aeterno, for symphonic orchestra. First performance: Music Scene 1976, Pristina.
 Pentalfa, for symphonic ensemble. First performance: Opatija 1976.
 Dialogue, for double bass and orchestra. First performance: Pristina 1977.
 Marginalët I, for symphonic orchestra. First performance: Opatija 1977.
 Marginalët II, for symphonic orchestra. First performance: Music Scene 1978, Pristina.
 Koncert për viol dhe orkestër, concerto for viola and orchestra. First performance: 1978, Days of Kosovar Music.
 Quasi Concerto, for orchestra, 1978.
 Koncert për violinë dhe orkestër. First performance: 1987.
 Koncert për flautë dhe harqe, concerto for flute and string. 1988.
 Symphonic Movement, for orchestra. 1989.
 Transformime, for strings. 1990.
 Capriccio, for strings. 1990.
 Concerto for piano and orchestra. 1990.
 Scherzo, for orchestra. 1991.
 Salvatio, for orchestra. 1991.
 Dassacaglia, for strings. 1991.
 Sinfonieta, for orchestra. 1992.
 Scherzo, for solo violin. 1992.
 Concerto for oboe and strings. 1992.
 Dance from Albania, for orchestra and strings. 1992.
 Reflections, for clarinet and orchestra. 1993.
 Hosana, for choir. 1993.
 Adieu dhe lamento, for solo soprano and piano. 1994.
 Christus Factus, for choir. 1996.
 Sonatinagiocosa, for solo violin. 1996.
 Koncert për violinë dhe orkestër alla Paganini, for Yehudi Menuhin. 1996.
 Passacaglia, for violin and strings. 1996.

Koci, Akil Mark, compositions by